The Palisadian-Post is a weekly subscription newspaper serving Pacific Palisades, California, published each Thursday by the Pacific Palisades Post. The company also publishes 90272 Magazine and the weekly newspaper The Shopper, also known as the Post-Shopper. The Palisadian Post was founded in 1928 and is currently owned by Palisadian Alan Smolinisky, who was born and raised in Pacific Palisades. The newspaper's editor-in-chief is Sarah Shmerling.

Pacific Palisades was founded in early 1922 by Methodists who migrated west.  In September 1924, the fledgling Methodist-based community's governing body, the Pacific Palisades Association, began publishing a monthly news sheet known as the “Progress,” edited by Thomas R. Gettys.  Each issue carried local church and social items and the latest real estate sales in a town being marketed with the slogan “Where the Mountains Meet the Sea.”

Thirty-two-year-old Telford Work moved to the Palisades in March 1926 as director of public relations for the Pacific Palisades Association.  A journalism graduate from the University of Southern California who had assembled a small chain of local newspapers near Fresno, Work became editor of the “Progress.”  On May 4, 1928, he launched The Palisadian, an 8-page weekly tabloid that sold for five cents a copy.  “It is with the confidence that an alert, constructive-spirited newspaper, distinctive in format and devoting itself resolutely in its news and editorial columns to making Pacific Palisades the business, banking, school and religious center of the north shore section...will meet with a hearty welcome from the residents of Pacific Palisades and the surrounding sections that the publisher herewith presents the first issue of The Palisadian,” Work wrote in his front-page introduction.  The lead story announced that $1 million was being spent to pave Marquez Avenue (now Chautauqua) and plant trees along the community's link with Santa Monica Canyon.  
                
On September 7, 1934, Work sold The Palisadian to his friend Clifford D. Clearwater, who in 1922 had been one of the first settlers in the community with his young wife, Zola.  In fact, the first of their three children was the second child ever born in the Palisades.
Although untrained as a journalist (his previous jobs included delivering the mail by horseback as the town's original postal carrier), Clearwater had natural talents that enabled him to serve with distinction as editor, publisher, photographer, and civic leader until his death in 1956.

When Clearwater died of a heart attack in 1956 at the age of 59, his widow Zola took over as editor and publisher.  By 1960 she was ready to retire and sell her newspaper to “crosstown” rivals Charles Brown and William Brown, twin brothers who in 1954 had acquired the Pacific Palisades Post, a separate publication that was established in 1950.  The Browns immediately consolidated both papers into one operation at 839 Via de la Paz, where two years earlier they had built their own printing plant.  The plant enabled the Browns to publish their paper in a broadsheet format (today's standard newspaper format), as opposed to The Palisadian's smaller tabloid size.

Charlie and Bill Brown ran a thriving operation, financially and editorially until August 1981, when they sold their business to the Small Family of Kankakee, Illinois.  Jean Alice Small, her daughter, Jennifer Small, and her two sons, Len R. Small and Thomas P. Small, led the newspaper until 2012 when they sold the paper to Alan Smolinisky, a real estate entrepreneur born and raised in the Palisades. Thirty-three-year-old Alan Smolinisky purchased the Palisadian-Post, Post Printing and the building located at 839 Via de la Paz on December 5, 2012.  In a column in the December 7, 2012 issue of the newspaper, Smolinsky explained his reasons for buying the paper.  A January 30, 2013, Los Angeles Times article quoted Smolinisky as saying, "Pacific Palisades is my favorite place on Earth, and the Palisadian-Post is my favorite newspaper" and "I have a moral obligation to make sure this newspaper is published every Thursday for as long as I live."  Smolinisky has added breaking news email alerts, opened up a booth at the Sunday farmer's market, sponsored the town spelling bee, started a speaker series, added Sudoku, expanded the popular 2 cents worth column, and addressed some delivery problems.  Bill Bruns, who had been editor of the paper since 1993, retired after 20 years of service. Smolinisky replaced all of the writers, and sold the paper's longtime building due to the printing operation being outsourced.  In September 2013, the newspaper moved into new headquarters in Palisades Village.  The paper currently has 19 full-time staff members and over 5,000 paid subscribers (the most in the 87-year history of the paper).  A one-year subscription costs $79.

References

External links
Palisadian-Post (official site)
Alan Smolinisky, "Why I've Bought the Palisadian-Post", Palisadian-Post, December 7, 2012.

1928 establishments in California
Newspapers published in Greater Los Angeles
Pacific Palisades, Los Angeles
Publications established in 1928
Weekly newspapers published in California